Standifer may refer to:

 Standifer Bluff, Dustin Island, Antarctica
 G. M. Standifer Construction Company, an American shipbuilding company

People with the surname
 Bill Standifer (1853-1903), American gunman and lawman
 James Israel Standifer (1779–1837), American politician
 Leon C. Standifer (1925-2016), American soldier, novelist and professor
 Lonnie Standifer (1926-1996), American scientist

See also
 Sandifer, a surname
 Standiford, Louisville, United States
 Stannifer, New South Wales, Australia